Kuhistoni Mastchoh District or Nohiya-i Kuhistoni Mastchoh, also known as the Gorno-Matchinsky Region is a district in Sughd Region, Tajikistan. The capital of district is the village of Mehron. The population of the district is 25,400 (January 2020 estimate).

Administrative divisions
They are as follows:

References

Districts of Tajikistan
Sughd Region